Eric Yoshiaki Dando (born July 1970), is a Melbourne writer, best known for the cult novel snail (Penguin, 1996), although his short fiction has appeared in many literary magazines and anthologies, including Hot Type (Penguin, 1995), Hot Sand (Penguin, 1996), The Age (Melbourne), Best Australian Stories, the Sleepers Alamanac, Going Down Swinging, Cordite, Undergrowth, Verity La, The Diamond & the Thief, Red Leaves / 紅葉, Torpedo and  The Lifted Brow. His most recent novel titled Oink, Oink, Oink: is a surreal, black comedy that plays with themes from science fiction, pop culture, consumerism, and genetic engineering. It was published by Hunter Publishers in October 2008, and reissued online as an e-book through Smashwords in May, 2011.

Biography
Eric Yoshiaki Dando was born in Tokyo but grew up in Melbourne. He was associated with the short lived grunge and dirty realism movements in Australian literature in the last century (1990s).  He also experiments with cryptographs (cryptograms) and humorous comics, the first of which was published in Cordite although inaccurately credited to Evan Dando.

Snail
Eric Dando's first novel Snail attracted widespread attention as one of the very few unsolicited novels published by a major publishing company. At the time, he was the youngest Australian writer published by Penguin. The story behind its publication became a minor sensation and has been subject to rumour and speculation to the point where it has taken on mythic qualities. The general story is that Eric Dando submitted his manuscript bound in floorboards, though sometimes it has been said they were palings from a fence amongst other things. The legend continues that it remained where it was in the office of Penguin until someone tripped over it and read it.

Currently, Snail is out of print, despite being voted in a 2010 Penguin Poll as one of the Top 100 books. The poll was officially conducted by Penguin via their Facebook page in which Australian fans were asked to vote for their favourite Penguin book of all time.

Snail explored themes of madness, suicide, and drugs. It is a darkly humorous novel, but one which is undeniably positive and optimistic rather than glorifying the grunge genre of which it is a part.

'Printed entirely in lower case, the book seems to present a challenge to the reader - to make it through without being driven mad by the deliberate feyness of lower case.' - Tegan Bennet, 1996.

'Dando writes, 'jokes are always needed', and jokes - mostly good jokes - are his book's mainstay.' - Australian Book Review, 1996.

'Refreshingly, Dando's philosophical approach appears to derive from the Renaissance tendency to view the human soul or psyche as having an analogical relationship with the natural world...' - Philosopher Magazine, 1996.

Oink, Oink, Oink: A Savage Modern Fable
Oink, Oink, Oink, described by its publisher as 'a savage modern fable about science, family, television, and love gone wrong', is a satirical novel describing a young man's journey from his home in Japan to meet his estranged, mad-scientist father in Melbourne, Australia. It was first published in Australia by Hunter Publishers in October 2008. Following difficulties with the publisher, Dando negotiated release of his book and it is currently in print via Smashwords. In selecting it as one of the "best books of 2008", reviewer Laurie Steed called it 'like Orwell on acid' and many reviewers have commented on its surreal tone and humorous, yet unsettling, view of consumerism, environmental degradation, and progress left to run wild.

In 2008, Oink, Oink, Oink was also featured on ABS's First Tuesday Bookclub show with many positive comments which further defined Dando's novels as having a cult following.

'Imagine Woody Allen and Chuck Palahniuk programming a festival for your brain... Part satirical horror, part spooky speculative fiction, a savagely funny critique of consumer-driven society.'— The Big Issue, Australia

'Vonnegut meets Orwell in Oink, Oink, Oink…a droll and unsettling nightmare of a book.'— The Age, Melbourne.

'This black little fable begins with one of the best opening sentences I've seen lately, something that could sum up an entire generation's understanding of 20th-century world history.'— Sydney Morning Herald

'Oink is futuristic, zany, black, surreal.'—The Sunday Age, Melbourne

Bibliography

Novels
 snail (Penguin, 1996)
 Oink, Oink, Oink: a savage modern fable (Hunter Publishers, 2008; reissued by Smashwords, 2011)

External links
ABC First Tuesday Bookclub episode
Author website: ericdando.com
Cordite
Oink Oink Oink on Smashwords

Living people
20th-century Australian novelists
20th-century Australian male writers
21st-century Australian novelists
Australian male novelists
Australian male short story writers
Writers from Melbourne
1970 births
20th-century Australian short story writers
21st-century Australian short story writers
Grunge lit
Grunge lit authors
21st-century Australian male writers